Montmérac is a commune in the Charente department of southwestern France. The municipality was established on 1 January 2016 and consists of the former communes of Montchaude and Lamérac.

See also 
Communes of the Charente department

References 

Communes of Charente

Communes nouvelles of Charente
Populated places established in 2016
2016 establishments in France